The following low-power television stations broadcast on digital or analog channel 26 in the United States:

 K20EC-D in Kanab, Utah
 K26CI-D in Cortez, etc., Colorado
 K26CK-D in Cottonwood/Grangevil, Idaho
 K26CL-D in Alexandria, Minnesota
 K26CS-D in St. James, Minnesota
 K26CV-D in Ogallala, Nebraska
 K26DB-D in Astoria, Oregon
 K26DD-D in Kalispell, Montana
 K26DE-D in Bozeman, Montana
 K26DX-D in Raton, New Mexico
 K26EA-D in Milford, etc., Utah
 K26FM-D in Peetz, Colorado
 K26FP-D in Idalia, Colorado
 K26FQ-D in John Day, Oregon
 K26FT-D in Santa Barbara, California
 K26FV-D in La Grande, Oregon
 K26GF-D in Peach Springs, Arizona
 K26GG-D in Golconda, Nevada
 K26GL-D in Columbus, Montana
 K26GS-D in Harrison, Arkansas
 K26GV-D in Omak, Washington
 K26GX-D in Pleasant Valley, Colorado
 K26GY-D in Breckenridge, Colorado
 K26HO-D in Glide, Oregon
 K26HY-D in Ely, Nevada
 K26IC-D in Bremerton, Washington
 K26IH-D in Manti, etc., Utah
 K26IK-D in Heber & Midway, Utah
 K26IS-D in Woodward, etc., Oklahoma
 K26IT-D in Redstone, etc., Colorado
 K26JB-D in Wells, Nevada
 K26JC-D in Walker Lake, Nevada
 K26JI-D in Sibley, Iowa
 K26JN-D in Huntington, Utah
 K26JO-D in Guymon, Oklahoma
 K26JR-D in Turkey, Texas
 K26JY-D in Duckwater, Nevada
 K26KA-D in Drummond, Montana
 K26KC-D in Dallas, Texas
 K26KF-D in Duluth, Minnesota
 K26KG-D in Beowawe, Nevada
 K26KQ-D in Christmas Valley, Oregon
 K26LG-D in Phillips County, Montana
 K26LH-D in Snowmass Village, Colorado
 K26LJ-D in Coeur D'Alene, Idaho
 K26LM-D in Libby, Montana
 K26LQ-D in White Sulphur Springs, Montana
 K26LR-D in Helper, Utah
 K26LW-D in Sheridan, Wyoming
 K26MS-D in Collbran, Colorado
 K26MT-D in Paso Robles, California
 K26MV-D in Soldier Canyon, New Mexico
 K26MW-D in Lucerne Valley, California
 K26NB-D in Klamath Falls, Oregon
 K26NC-D in Elk City, Oklahoma
 K26ND-D in Hollis, Oklahoma
 K26NE-D in Florence, Oregon
 K26NG-D in East Flagstaff, Arizona
 K26NJ-D in Powers, Oregon
 K26NK-D in Wichita Falls, Texas
 K26NL-D in Gillette, Wyoming
 K26NM-D in Pullman, Washington
 K26NN-D in Bridger, etc., Montana
 K26NP-D in Overton, Nevada
 K26NQ-D in Hood River, Oregon
 K26NS-D in Fort Peck, Montana
 K26NV-D in Fishlake Resort, Utah
 K26NW-D in Marysvale, Utah
 K26NX-D in Madras, Oregon
 K26NZ-D in Kanarraville/New Harmony, Utah
 K26OA-D in Parowan/Enoch/Paragonah, Utah
 K26OC-D in Delta, Oak City, Utah
 K26OD-D in Globe, Arizona
 K26OE-D in Elko, Nevada
 K26OF-D in Roosevelt, Utah
 K26OH-D in Roseau, Minnesota
 K26OI-D in East Price, Utah
 K26OJ-D in Tucumcari, New Mexico
 K26OK-D in Lake Havasu City, Arizona
 K26OM-D in Shoshoni, Wyoming
 K26ON-D in Deer Lodge, etc., Montana
 K26OP-D in Holbrook, Idaho
 K26OS-D in Sapinero, Colorado
 K26OT-D in Akron, Colorado
 K26OV-D in Zuni, New Mexico
 K26OW-D in Garden Valley, Idaho
 K26OX-D in Colstrip, Montana
 K26OY-D in Malad City, Idaho
 K26OZ-D in Everett, Washington
 K26PA-D in Ardmore, Oklahoma
 K26PD-D in Scobey, Montana
 K26PF-D in Saint Cloud, Minnesota
 K26PG-D in Woody Creek, Colorado
 K26PI-D in Kansas City, Kansas
 K26PK-D in Nephi, Utah
 K26PL-D in Roswell, New Mexico
 K26PP-D in Santa Maria-Lompoc, California
 K26PQ-D in Oroville, California
 K26PR-D in Needles, California
 K38KL-D in Ellensburg, Washington
 K39FE-D in Willmar, Minnesota
 K40LO-D in Fillmore, etc., Utah
 K46IP-D in Cottage Grove, Oregon
 KCNH-LD in Springfield, Missouri
 KCPO-LP in Sioux Falls, South Dakota
 KCVB-CD in Logan, Utah
 KCYM-LD in Des Moines, Iowa
 KDJT-CD in Salinas/Monterey, etc., California
 KDRC-LD in Redding, California
 KENH-LD in Hot Springs, Arkansas
 KFWY-LD in Cheyenne, Wyoming
 KGNG-LD in Las Vegas, Nevada
 KLHO-LD in Oklahoma City, Oklahoma
 KLHP-LD in Dallas, Texas
 KMRZ-LD in Pomona, California
 KNMW-LD in Mineral Wells, Texas
 KSKJ-CD in Van Nuys, California
 KSXC-LD in South Sioux City, Nebraska
 KTES-LD in Abilene, Texas
 KTKB-LD in Tamuning, Guam
 KTKV-LD in Twin Falls, Idaho
 KTVU (DRT) in San Jose, California
 KUCL-LD in Salt Lake City, Utah
 KUKR-LD in Santa Rosa, California
 KULC-LD in Port Arthur, Texas
 KVBC-LP in Reedley, California
 KVBT-LD in Santa Clara, etc., Utah
 KXTS-LD in Victoria, Texas
 KXUN-LD in Sallisaw, Oklahoma
 KYEX-LD in Juneau, Alaska
 KZBZ-CD in Clovis, New Mexico
 KZFC-LD in Windsor, Colorado
 KZGN-LD in Ridgecrest, California
 KZTE-LD in Fulton, Arkansas
 W26BB-D in Vicksburg, Mississippi
 W26BF-D in Elmira, New York
 W26CV-D in Mansfield, Pennsylvania
 W26DC-D in Roslyn, New York
 W26DC-D in Hempstead, New York
 W26DH-D in Auburn, Indiana
 W26DK-D in San Juan, Puerto Rico
 W26DP-D in Inverness, Florida
 W26EE-D in Wittenberg, Wisconsin
 W26EM-D in Athens, Georgia
 W26EP-D in Potsdam, New York
 W26EQ-D in State College, Pennsylvania
 W26EU-D in Boston, Massachusetts
 W26EV-D in Portsmouth, Virginia
 W26EW-D in Huntington, West Virginia
 W26EX-D in Jacksonville, Florida
 W26EY-D in Manteo, North Carolina
 W26FA-D in Marion, North Carolina
 W26FB-D in Canton/Waynesville, North Carolina
 W26FE-D in Montgomery, Alabama
 W26FG-D in Eau Claire, Wisconsin
 WARZ-LD in Smithfield, North Carolina
 WCSN-LD in Columbus, Ohio
 WDID-LD in Savannah, Georgia
 WDMI-LD in Minneapolis, Minnesota
 WDRJ-LD in Albany, Georgia
 WEDS-LD in Mobile, Alabama
 WEKA-LD in Canton, Ohio
 WGCE-CD in Rochester, New York
 WGVT-LD in Gainesville, Florida
 WHDN-CD in Naples, Florida
 WHEH-LD in Lumberton, North Carolina
 WISH-TV (DRT) in Indianapolis, Indiana
 WIVD-LD in Newcomerstown, Ohio
 WIYE-LD in Parkersburg, West Virginia
 WJAC-TV in Du Bois, Pennsylvania
 WLVO-LD in Cumming, Georgia
 WMPJ-LD in Calhoun City, Mississippi
 WMTW in Portland, Maine
 WNTU-LD in Nashville, Tennessee
 WOHW-LD in Lima, Ohio
 WOSC-CD in Pittsburgh, Pennsylvania
 WPVN-CD in Chicago, Illinois
 WQAV-CD in Glassboro, New Jersey
 WRDE-LD in Salisbury, Maryland
 WROB-LD in Topeka, Kansas
 WRUG-LD in Baton Rouge, Louisiana
 WSNN-LD in Sarasota, Florida
 WTGC-LD in New Bern, North Carolina
 WTSJ-LD in Milwaukee, Wisconsin
 WXAX-CD in Clearwater, Florida
 WYBN-LD in Cobleskill, New York
 WYBU-CD in Columbus, Georgia
 WYCU-LD in Charlestown, etc., New Hampshire
 WYLN-LP in Hazleton, Pennsylvania
 WYXN-LD in New York, New York, to move to channel 30 and to use another station's spectrum
 WZEO-LD in La Crosse, Wisconsin

The following low-power stations, which are no longer licensed, formerly broadcast on digital or analog channel 26:
 K26DK in Rock Springs, Wyoming
 K26EH-D in Austin, Nevada
 K26EM in Orangeville, Utah
 K26EP in Dulce/Lumberton, New Mexico
 K26FK in Rulison, Colorado
 K26FS in Blythe, California
 K26GI in Woodland & Kamas, Utah
 K26GK in Lakeport, California
 K26HL in Holualoa, Hawaii
 K26HS-D in Tillamook, Oregon
 K26KM-D in Orr, Minnesota
 K26NR-D in Rainier, Oregon
 K26NT-D in Granite Falls, Minnesota
 K26PH-D in Clarks Fork, Wyoming
 KDLU-LP in St. George, Utah
 KGKY-LD in Joplin, Missouri
 KSWX-LD in Duncan, Oklahoma
 W26BV in Panama City, Florida
 W26BZ in Victor, New York
 W26CE in New York, New York
 W26CQ in Colebrook, New Hampshire
 W26DS-D in La Grange, Georgia
 WDRL-LD in Wilmington, North Carolina
 WEDD-LD in Roanoke, Virginia
 WEYB-LD in Montgomery, Alabama
 WLPC-LP in Detroit, Michigan
 WMUN-LP in Muncie, Indiana

References

26 low-power